Johnny Jacobsen (19 November 1955 – 8 December 2020) was a Danish footballer who played as a midfielder. He played in one match for the Denmark national team in 1980.

References

External links
 
 

1955 births
2020 deaths
Footballers from Copenhagen
Danish men's footballers
Association football midfielders
Denmark international footballers
Eredivisie players
Boldklubben af 1893 players
Fremad Amager players
Brøndby IF players
Feyenoord players
Willem II (football club) players
Danish expatriate men's footballers
Danish expatriate sportspeople in the Netherlands
Expatriate footballers in the Netherlands